A crosshair is another name for a reticle. Other meanings include:

 A song by the Danish band Blue Foundation.
 Cross Hair (G.I. Joe), fictional G.I. Joe character.
 Crosshairs (Transformers), several robot superhero characters in the Transformers robot superhero franchise.
 Crosshairs, a feature of some screen magnifiers.
ASUS Crosshair, a line of computer motherboards for AMD processors.
Crosshair (Star Wars), a deformed clone trooper and former member of The Bad Batch in the Star Wars franchise.

See also
Corsair (disambiguation)